Dillard, also known as Dillards, is an unincorporated community in Dale County, Alabama, United States.

History
A post office operated under the name Dillard from 1890 to 1906.

References

Unincorporated communities in Dale County, Alabama
Unincorporated communities in Alabama